Carell is a surname. Notable people with the surname include:

 Lianella Carell (1927–2000), Italian film actress and screenwriter
 Monroe J. Carell Jr. (1932–2008), American businessman and philanthropist
 Nancy Carell (born 1966), wife of Steve Carell
 Paul Carell (1911–1997), German non-fiction writer
 Rudi Carrell (1934–2006), Dutch entertainer
 Steve Carell (born 1962), American comedian, actor, producer and writer
 Thomas Carell (born 1966), German biochemist

See also
 Caral
 Carel
 Carrel
 Carrell
 Caril
 Carol (given name)
 Caroll
 Carrol
 Carroll
 Caryl
 Caryll
 Carryl

English-language surnames
French-language surnames
Surnames from given names